Carsten Smith (born 13 July 1932, in Oslo) is a Norwegian judge and lawyer.

He served as Dean of the Faculty of Law, University of Oslo (1977–1979) and as Chief Justice of the Supreme Court of Norway (1991–2002). After his retirement from the court, he continued to handle international arbitration cases, and worked with the United Nations.

He was appointed Reader in Law at the University of Oslo in 1960 and Professor of Law with a specialization in commercial and banking law in 1964. He also was the first chairman of the Sami Rights Commission.

Among his many published works is Kausjonsrett. Carsten Smith was awarded the Grand Cross of the Royal Norwegian Order of St. Olav on 13 May 2003. In 1985, he received the Fritt Ord Honorary Award. He is a member of the Norwegian Academy of Science and Letters. He also received honorary degrees from several institutions, including Uppsala University and Brigham Young University.

Personal life
In 1958, he married fellow lawyer Lucy Smith, whom he survived. One of Norway's first female lawyers, she was also a law professor and the former rector of the University of Oslo. They have three daughters who became lawyers.

Education
Smith took his examen artium at Oslo Cathedral School in 1949 and began studying law at the University of Oslo that year.

References

1932 births
Living people
Chief justices of Norway
Academic staff of the Faculty of Law, University of Oslo
Members of the Norwegian Academy of Science and Letters
University of Oslo alumni
People educated at Oslo Cathedral School